The Can-Am Senior B Lacrosse League is a Senior-level Canadian and American box lacrosse league. The teams are located in the Southwestern Ontario and Upstate New York regions. Sanctioned by the First Nations Lacrosse Association, the champions of the Can-Am league compete for the Presidents Cup, the Canadian National Senior B championship. Can-Am teams have won the Presidents' Cup five times.

History 
Formed in 1969 as the North American Lacrosse Association, the league reformed after eight seasons. Renamed Can-Am in 1978.

Newtown Golden Eagles are the most successful team to-date winning the Can-Am title 11 times. The Eagles have medaled at Presidents' Cup three times, including gold in 2000.

Teams

Former member teams

Buffalo-Ft. Erie Braves
 Fort Erie Hawks (2001)
 Hagersville Tigers
 Hagersville Warriors
 Mohawk Storm (2003-05)
Native Sons (2015-18)
 Niagara Hawks (2002-12)
 Ohsweken Wolves
 Oneida Silverhawks (2001)
 Oswego Hawks (2000-01)
Pinewoods Smoke (2000-17)
 Rochester Greywolves (2008-13)
 Six Nations Braves (2003)
 Six Nations Mohawk Stars (2001)
 Six Nations Slash (2011-17)
 Six Nations Sting (2006-09)
 Steamburg/Coldspring Hellbenders (2007-08)

Champions

References

External links
Can-Am Lacrosse League
 Newtown Golden Eagles website
Onondaga Redhawks website
Rochester River Monsters website
 Tonawanda Braves website

Lacrosse leagues in Canada
Lacrosse leagues in the United States
Sports leagues established in 1978